Carlton Trail College (known as Carlton Trail Regional College until 2013) is a publicly funded regional college with three campuses in the province of Saskatchewan, Canada, along with classroom sites in other locations in the province. The college provides post-secondary education to predominantly rural and smaller communities north east of Saskatoon. In 2012 the college received $3.8 million in funding from the province of Saskatchewan.

See also
Higher education in Saskatchewan
List of colleges in Canada#Saskatchewan

References

External links
Carlton Trail College

Colleges in Saskatchewan
Vocational education in Canada